JC on the Set is the debut album by saxophonist  James Carter recorded in 1993 and released on the Japanese DIW label.

Reception
The Allmusic review by Scott Yanow awarded the album 4½ stars, stating, "Twenty-five at the time of this CD, James Carter had already absorbed much of the tradition... He also shows that he has the courage to play completely outside whenever it seems logical to him... James Carter puts on quite a tour-de-force throughout this very impressive set". The Penguin Guide to Jazz said that the album “delivered in trumps.”

Track listing
All compositions by James Carter except as indicated
 "JC on the Set" - 6:27	
 "Baby Girl Blues" - 7:49	
 "Worried and Blue" (Don Byas) - 8:07	
 "Blues for a Nomadic Princess" - 13:53	
 "Caravan" (Duke Ellington, Irving Mills, Juan Tizol) - 9:44	
 "Hour of Parting" (Mischa Spoliansky, incorrectly credited to Sun Ra) - 8:20	
 "Lunatic" (John Hardee) - 4:20	
 "Sophisticated Lady" (Ellington, Mills, Mitchell Parish) - 6:41

Personnel
James Carter - tenor saxophone, alto saxophone, baritone saxophone
Craig Taborn - piano
Jaribu Shahid - bass
Tani Tabbal - drums

References 

1994 debut albums
James Carter (musician) albums
DIW Records albums